Anvardhikanpet (or Anvarthikanpettai) is a  village in Ranipettai district in the Indian state of Tamil Nadu.

Nearby villages include Mel Aavadham, Keezh Aavadham, Aavadham pudhupattu, Ramapuram, minnal, Kunnathur, Melkalathur, Meleri, Kattupakkam and Mahendravadi.

Nearby towns 
Arakkonam is about 15 km from the village, whereas one of the six abodes of Hindu God Murugan, Tiruttani is 22 km from here. One of the major towns of Vellore district, Sholinghur is at a proximity of 23 km.

People and occupation 
Telugu is widely spoken among the native villagers. Tamil is prevalent among all people who in near by villages.

Education
 The Government High School is located in this village.
 "Kilai Noolagam (Library)" is located near bus stop.

Transport
 Anvardhikanpet is well-connected by bus to the nearby towns Arakonam and Tiruthani.
 This village has a railway station "Anvardhikanpet" at 1 km distance with two tracks (Up Line & Down Line).
      Up Line: Connects to Chennai, Tirupathy...
      Down Line: Connects to Walaja Road, Katpadi (VELLORE), Jolarpettai, Bangalore.
Yelagiri express and Kaveri Express are important trains in this station. And also some other local trains are running here.

It has four streets with a total population of around 1000.

Villages in Vellore district